The SF International HipHop DanceFest is an annual hiphop dance and music event in San Francisco, California. It was founded in 1999 by Micaya.

Overview 
The DanceFest, curated by Micaya, has a focus on community and collaboration rather than competition or battles, showcasing many different hiphop styles from around the world. These hiphop dance styles include popping, locking, strutting, house, krumping, waacking, turfing, breaking, and many more, with West Coast styles well represented. The festival fundraises each year in order to fully fund artist travel and hotel expenses. Each year has an overarching theme, often emphasizing social commentary, as well as bringing street styles to a fine arts stage.

History

1999 
The First Annual SF International HipHop DanceFest was held at Theatre Artaud in San Francisco.

2020 
In 2020, because of the COVID-19 pandemic, the DanceFest took place virtually. Speakers included RuPaul, Alicia Garza, performance artist Kenichi Ebina, and radio personality Sterling James.

See also 
 List of hip hop music festivals
 Hip hop culture

References

Culture of San Francisco
Dance festivals in the United States
Hip hop music festivals in the United States